WVMO-LP (98.7 FM) is a community-owned radio station in the city of Monona, Wisconsin. The station, which went on air in 2015, broadcasts a variety format that includes local programming and Americana.

See also
List of community radio stations in the United States

References

External links
Official website

VMO-LP
Community radio stations in the United States
Radio stations established in 2015
2015 establishments in Wisconsin
VMO-LP